Angélique Spincer (born 25 June 1984 in Orsay, France) is a French team handball player. She plays for the French handball club Issy-Paris Hand and the French national team, and participated at the 2011 World Women's Handball Championship in Brazil.

References

External links

1984 births
Living people
French female handball players
Mediterranean Games competitors for France
Competitors at the 2005 Mediterranean Games